Zheng Yuguo (born 5 November 1961) is a Chinese engineer who is a professor at Zhejiang University of Technology, and an academician of the Chinese Academy of Engineering.

Biography
Zheng was born in Xiangshan County, Zhejiang, on 5 November 1961. After resuming the college entrance examination, in 1979, he enrolled at Zhejiang Engineering College (now Zhejiang University of Technology), where he majored in the Department of Chemical Machinery.

After graduating in 1983, he stayed at the university and worked successively as an instructor (1983–1995), associate professor (1995–2000), full professor (2000–present), deputy dean of the School of Biological and Environmental Engineering (2006–2010), and dean of the of Biological and Environmental Engineering (2010–2020).

In March 2018, he became a member of the 13th National Committee of the Chinese People's Political Consultative Conference.

Honours and awards
 2008 State Technological Invention Award (Second Class)
 2010 State Technological Invention Award (Second Class)
 2014 State Science and Technology Progress Award (Second Class)
 27 November 2017 Member of the Chinese Academy of Engineering (CAE)
 November 2019 Science and Technology Progress Award of the Ho Leung Ho Lee Foundation

References

1961 births
Living people
People from Xiangshan County, Zhejiang
Engineers from Zhejiang
Zhejiang University of Technology alumni
Academic staff of Zhejiang University of Technology
Members of the Chinese Academy of Engineering